Rębiechowo  is a village in the administrative district of Gmina Żukowo, within Kartuzy County, Pomeranian Voivodeship, in northern Poland. The village has a population of 463.

In 1973 the eastern part of the village was incorporated into the city of Gdańsk, where it now forms a district also known as Rębiechowo. This is the location of Gdańsk Lech Wałęsa Airport, which was formerly called Gdańsk-Rębiechowo (and continues to be referred to informally by that name).

References

Villages in Kartuzy County